The Doll is a 1938 Czech comedy film directed by Robert Land. It was Land's last movie. He escaped to France in 1938 and died there in 1940.

A German language version of the film was shot simultaneously by Josef Medeotti-Boháč. It was released under the name Robot Girl Nr. 1, but today it's considered lost.

Cast
 Ferenc Futurista as Officer Bedřich Vrba
 Milada Gampeová as Vrba's wife
 Jiří Dohnal as Kajetán Vrba
 Věra Ferbasová Věra
 Josef Gruss as Industrialist Antonín Dominik
 Milka Balek-Brodská as Adéla Dominiková
 Zdeněk Hora as Sculptor Jaroslav Výr
 Ljuba Hermanová as Výr's girlfriend Hella
 Světla Svozilová as Journalist Maryna Tečková
 Stanislav Neumann as Detective Liška

Reception
The film was commercially successful, but it was panned by critics.

References

External links
 
 Věra Ferbasová sings a song "Žena-robot" in the movie on YouTube

1938 films
Czechoslovak comedy films
1938 comedy films
Czechoslovak black-and-white films
1930s Czech films